Garland Frederick Lawing (August 29, 1918 – September 27, 1996) was an American professional baseball player. He appeared in Major League Baseball as an outfielder and pinch hitter in ten games during the  season for the Cincinnati Reds and New York Giants.

Born in Gastonia, North Carolina, Lawing broke into pro baseball in 1938 in the Class D North Carolina State League.  He had reached the Class A1 (now Double-A) level in 1943 when, after only 24 games played, he entered the United States Army. Lawing served in the European Theater of Operations during World War II and missed the 1944 and 1945 baseball seasons.

He split 1946 between the Reds and the Giants, going hitless in three at bats with Cincinnati as a centerfielder and pinch hitter in two games played on May 29 and June 6.  Then, on June 8, his contract was sold to the Giants, and he collected his first MLB hit, a pinch single, off Johnny Vander Meer and his old teammates from the Reds on June 11.  But he played in only eight total games for New York, four as a starting outfielder, and batted only .167 as a Giant.  For his MLB career, he hit .133 in 15 at-bats.

Lawing then returned to minor league baseball in 1947, and retired after the 1954 season.  He died in Murrells Inlet, South Carolina, at the age of 78.

References

External links

1918 births
1996 deaths
American expatriate baseball players in Canada
Atlanta Crackers players
Baseball players from North Carolina
Birmingham Barons players
Brandon Greys players
Chattanooga Lookouts players
Cincinnati Reds players
Columbia Reds players
Durham Bulls players
Jersey City Giants players
Major League Baseball outfielders
New York Giants (NL) players
Ogdensburg Maples players
People from Gastonia, North Carolina
Quebec Braves players
Reidsville Luckies players
West Palm Beach Indians players
Wichita Indians players
Mooresville Moors players
United States Army personnel of World War II